is a Japanese jazz pianist.

Career
He was born in Kobe, Japan. He began playing organ at two and by seven was an improviser. He appeared on Japanese television with his father from 1968 to 1970. At twelve he switched to piano after being impressed by the albums of Oscar Peterson. In 1980, he entered the Berklee College of Music and later worked with Gary Burton. He also had his recording debut in 1983 before returning to his native Japan.

Ozone has collaborated with vocalist Kimiko Itoh. They appeared as a duo at the Montreux Jazz Festival, and he produced her album Kimiko, which won the 2000 Swing Journal jazz disk grand prix for Japanese vocalist.

Ozone is in charge of visiting professor of Jazz course in Kunitachi College of Music since 2010.

Honors
2003: Honorary Doctorate of Music from Berklee College of Music.
2018:

Discography

As leader/co-leader 
 Live!! At The Berklee Performance Center with Phil Wilson (Shiah, 1983) – live
 Makoto Ozone (CBS/Sony, 1984) – rec. 1981
 After (CBS/Sony, 1986)
 Spring Is Here (Columbia, 1987)
 Now You Know (Columbia, 1987)
 Starlight (JVC/Victor, 1990)
 Paradise Wings (JVC/Victor, 1991)
 Walk Alone (JVC/Victor, 1992)
 Breakout (Verve, 1994)
 Face to face with Gary Burton (GRP, 1995)
 Nature Boys (Verve, 1995)
 At the Montreux Jazz Festival (Videoarts, 1997) – live
 Makoto Ozone: The Trio (Verve, 1997)
 Three Wishes (Verve, 1998) – rec. 1997
 Dear Oscar (Polydor, 1998)
 No Strings Attached (Polydor, 1999)
 Pandora (Verve, 2000)
 So Many Colors (Verve, 2001)
 Treasure (Verve, 2002)
 Reborn (Verve, 2003)
 Virtuosi with Gary Burton (Concord, 2003)
 New Spirit (Universal, 2004)
 Real (Verve, 2005)
 Duet with Satoru Shionoya (Verve, 2005) – live
 Alive!!: Live at Blue Note Tokyo (Universal, 2007) – live rec. 2006
 Falling in love, again (Universal, 2007)
 Ballads  (Verve, 2008)
 Jungle (Verve, 2009)
 Road to Chopin (Universal, 2010)
 Haiku  with Anna Maria Jopek (Universal Music Polska, 2011)
 Live & Let Live - Love For Japan (Verve, 2011) - live 
 Pure Pleasure For The Piano with Ellis Marsalis Jr. (EmArcy, 2012)
 My Witch's Blue with Christian McBride, Jeff "Tain" Watts (Verve, 2012)
 Time Thread with Gary Burton (Verve, 2013)
 Dimensions (Verve, 2017)
 Until We Vanish (Universal, 2019)
 Resonance with Chick Corea (Universal, 2021) – live rec. 2016
 Ozone 60 (Verve, 2021)
 Ozone 60: Standards (Verve, 2022)

As No Name Horses
 No Name Horses (Universal, 2006)
 No Name Horses II (Verve, 2008)
 Jungle (Verve, 2009)
 Back at The Club "IN TRIBUTE" (Universal, 2011)
 Road: Rhapsody in Blue (Universal, 2014)

Soundtracks
  - Original Soundtrack (Universal, 2008)
 NHK The World Heritage: The Swell of Time - Original Soundtrack (Universal, 2011)

As sideman
With Gary Burton
 Real Life Hits (ECM, 1984)
 Whiz Kids (ECM, 1986)
 Generations (Concord, 2004)

With Bobby Shew
 Breakfast Wine (Pausa, 1985)

References

External links
Official website
[ All Music]

1961 births
Living people
Japanese jazz pianists
Berklee College of Music alumni
Musicians from Kobe
21st-century pianists